Windy City may refer to:

Cities
Wellington, New Zealand
Chicago, Illinois ("Windy City")
Baku, Azerbaijan, Küləklər şəhəri ("the City of Winds")
Balkanabat, Turkmenistan
Edinburgh, Scotland
Essaouira, Morocco
Hsinchu, "Windy City" of Taiwan
Lethbridge, Alberta, Canada
Luleå, Sweden, Den blåsiga staden  ("The Windy City")
Majalengka in West Java, Indonesia ("the City of Wind")
Nganjuk in East Java, Indonesia 
Pachuca, Hidalgo in Mexico, La Bella Airosa ('The Beautiful Windy One')
Port Elizabeth, South Africa
Zaragoza, Spain
 Santa Ana, Orange County California (The City With The Wind: The Santa Ana Winds)

Entertainment
Windy City (musical), based on the play The Front Page
Windy City (film), a 1984 film
"(Just Blew in from the) Windy City", a song from the 1953 film musical Calamity Jane
Windy City (album), a 2017 studio album by bluegrass-country artist Alison Krauss
Windy City Breakdown, a 1977 album by Jonathan Cain

Sport
Metro Squash Windy City Open, a squash tournament held annually in Chicago
Windy City (horse) (1949–1964), Thoroughbred racehorse
Windy City Bulls, an NBA Developmental League franchise based in Hoffman Estates, Illinois owned by the Chicago Bulls

Other uses
Windy City Times, a Chicago LGBT newspaper